Unaligned literally means "not aligned". It may refer to:

 Unaligned characters in Vampire: The Requiem
 In other role-playing games, it refers to someone who does not fit within the game's alignment system, for example, in NetHack, Moloch is unaligned
 Non-Aligned Movement of states
 Unaligned data structures in computer science